Jonas Björkman and Kevin Ullyett were the defending champion, but Björkman was retired in November 2008.Ullyett partnered up with Bruno Soares, and they won in the final 6–4, 7–6(7–4) against Simon Aspelin and Paul Hanley.

Seeds

Draw

External links
 Main Draw

If Stockholm Open - Men's Doubles
- Doubles, 2009 If Stockholm Open